Chauncey (also Chauncy) Leon Westbrook (October 21, 1921 – November 2, 2006), known professionally as Chauncey "Lord" Westbrook, was an American jazz guitarist.

Westbrook worked with Rex Stewart, Buddy Johnson (1953–57), Aretha Franklin, Charlie Rouse, Little Willie John, Ernestine Allen, Little Jimmy Scott, and Sammy Davis, Jr. He was a member of The Orioles in the early 1950s.

In 1956 he recorded his solo album Get Out of Town for  Morty Craft's newly acquired Melba Records. He was a session musician on Aretha Franklin’s first Columbia recording, Aretha: With The Ray Bryant Combo.

Discography

As leader
 1956: Get Out of Town (Melba Records LP)

As sideman
 1955: "Rock 'n' Roll" – Buddy Johnson (Mercury)
 1956: "Please Say You're Mine" b/w "With All My Heart" - Jimmy Jones with Warren Lucky, Kelly Owens, Leonard Gaskin, Panama Francis
 1956: "Just Leave It to Me" b/w "Is It Too Soon" - Debutantes (Savoy 1191)
 1957: Walkin'  - Buddy Johnson & His Orchestra 
 1958: "I May Never" b/w "What" - Jimmy Scott
 1958: "Everybody Stroll" b/w "Sone Down" - The O.C. All Stars
 1958: "Ophelia" b/w "Hot Calypso" - The O.C. All Stars
 1958: Swinging Like Tate - Buddy Tate with Buck Clayton, Dicky Wells, Earl Warren, Skip Hall, Lord Westbrook, Aaron Bell, Jo Jones.
 1958: Henderson Homecoming – Rex Stewart (United Artists, 1959)
 1959: "You Can't Do Me This Way" b/w "These Are the Things" - David Thorne - Haywood Henry, Ernie Hayes, Carl Lynch, Leonard Gaskin, Osie Johnson, David Thorne, Teacho Wiltshire
 1960: No More in Life - Mildred Anderson
 1960: The Happy Jazz of Rex Stewart - Rex Stewart Septet (Swingville, 2006)
 1961: Shorty & Doc – Shorty Baker and Doc Cheatham
 1961: Aretha: With The Ray Bryant Combo - Aretha Franklin and Ray Bryant
 1961: Let It Roll - Ernestine Allen
 1961: These Dues - Clea Bradford
 1962: If You Need Me - Solomon Burke (Atlantic)
 1963: Bossa Nova Bacchanal - Charlie Rouse
 1964: Blues Around the Clock - Jimmy Witherspoon (Prestige)

References

1921 births
2006 deaths
20th-century American guitarists
American jazz guitarists